The Oklahoma State League was a Class D level minor baseball league based in Oklahoma that existed in 1912 and again from 1922 to 1924. L.S. Dodds (1912), Leo Meyer (1912), C.E. Plott (1922), E.A. Daniels (1922–1924) and A.L. Ragan (1924) served as presidents of the league. Hall of Fame pitcher Carl Hubbell played in the league, making his professional debut with the 1923 Cushing Refiners.

History
The league was represented by eight teams in 1912: the Anadarko Indians, Holdenville Hitters, McAlester Miners, Muskogee Indians, Oklahoma City Senators, Okmulgee Glassblowers,  Tulsa Terriers and Guthrie Spas. The league disbanded on July 29, with the Glassblowers in first place and the Guthrie team in last.

Another incarnation of the league came about in 1922, represented by the Chickasha Chicks, Clinton Bulldogs, Duncan Oilers, El Reno Railroaders, Wilson Drillers and Guthrie Linters team. The Duncan Oilers finished first in the league regular season standings, with the Chickasha Chicks becoming the league champions, winning the league's playoff series.

In 1923, the league was represented by the Cushing Refiners, Bristow Producers, Duncan Oilers, Clinton Bulldogs, El Reno Railroaders, Shawnee Indians, Drumright Boosters/Ponca City Poncans and the Guthrie Linters. The Refiners finished in first in the regular season and Bristow won the league championship.

The league played its final season in 1924, represented by the Ardmore Bearcats/Pawhuska Huskies, Bristow Producers, Cushing Refiners, Shawnee Indians, Duncan Oilers, Ponca City Poncans, Blackwell Gassers and the McAlester Diggers, also based in Guthrie, Wewoka and Enid. The league disbanded on July 8, with Ardmore/Pawhuska  in first and the Guthrie/McAlester/Wewoka/Enid Harvesters team in last place.

Cities represented 

 Anadarko, OK: Anadarko Indians 1912 
 Ardmore, OK: Ardmore Bearcats 1924
 Blackwell, OK: Blackwell Gassers 1924 
 Bristow, OK: Bristow Producers 1923–1924 
 Chickasha, OK: Chickasha Chicks 1922 
 Clinton, OK: Clinton Bulldogs 1922–1923 
 Cushing, OK: Cushing Refiners 1923–1924 
 Drumright, OK: Drumright Boosters 1923 
 Duncan, OK: Duncan Oilers 1922-1924 
 El Reno, OK: El Reno Railroaders 1922–1923 
 Enid, OK: Enid 1924
 Eufaula, OK: Eufaula (1912)
 Guthrie, OK: Guthrie Spas 1912; Guthrie Linters 1922–1924 
 Holdenville, OK: Holdenville Hitters 1912 
 McAlester, OK: McAlester Miners 1912; McAlester Diggers 1924  
 Muskogee, OK: Muskogee Indians 1912 
 Oklahoma City, OK: Oklahoma City Senators 1912 
 Okmulgee, OK: Okmulgee Glassblowers 1912 
 Pawhuska, OK: Pawhuska Huskies 1924
 Ponca City, OK: Ponca City Poncans 1923-1924 
 Shawnee, OK: Shawnee Indians 1923–1924
 Tulsa, OK: Tulsa Terriers 1912
 Wewoka, OK & Holdenville, OK: Wewoka-Holdenville 1924 
 Wilson, OK: Wilson Drillers 1922

Standings & statistics

1912
1912 Oklahoma State League
schedule

League played a split–season schedule. Oklahoma City disbanded June 21. Andarko moved to Enid June 28; Oklahoma City moved to Eufaula June 28; Okmulgee folded June 29 The league officially disbanded July 2.

1922 to 1924

1922 Oklahoma State League
schedule
Chickasha became a road team in the second half. Playoff: Chickasha 4 games, Clinton 0.

1923 Oklahoma State League
schedule
 Drumright (11–21) moved to Ponca City June 7. Playoff: Bristow 4 games, Duncan 0.

1924 Oklahoma State League
schedule
Guthrie (8–18) moved to McAlester May 24; Ardmore (30–13) moved to Pawhuska June 8; McAlester (3–13) moved to Wewoka-Holdenville June 8, Wewoka-Holdenville moved to Enid in late June; Duncan disbanded July 6. The league disbanded July 8.

References

Defunct minor baseball leagues in the United States
Baseball leagues in Oklahoma
Sports leagues established in 1912
Sports leagues disestablished in 1924
1912 establishments in Oklahoma
1924 disestablishments in Oklahoma